K-1 Grand Prix '93 was a martial arts event held by the K-1 organization on April 30, 1993, at the Yoyogi National Gymnasium in Tokyo, Japan.  It was the inaugural K-1 World Grand Prix, featuring an eight-man tournament fought under K-1 rules (3 min. × 3 rounds + 1 extra round).  The eight tournament qualifiers were all invited on the basis of their achievements in the kickboxing world (for more information on this see the bulleted list below).  As well as tournament matches there was also a full contact karate bout between Andy Hug and Nobuaki Kakuda. The event featured ten fights with fighters representing seven countries. The winner was Branko Cikatić who defeated Ernesto Hoost in the final by first-round knockout, becoming the first K-1 World champion.

Tournament Qualifiers
Peter Aerts - W.M.T.A. Muay Thai Heavyweight World champion, I.K.B.F. World Heavyweight champion
Toshiyuki Atokawa - Karate World Cup '91 champion, All Japan Open Karate Championships champion   
Branko Cikatić - I.K.B.F. Kickboxing World Cruiserweight champion, W.K.A. Kickboxing World Cruiserweight champion, Muay Thai World Light Heavyweight Champion
Todd Hays - US National Kickboxing Heavyweight champion
Ernesto Hoost - W.K.A. Kickboxing World champion, W.M.T.A. Muay Thai World Light Heavyweight champion, Savate World champion
Changpuek Kiatsongrit - I.M.T.F Muay Thai World Light Heavyweight champion, W.M.K. World Heavyweight champion  
Masaaki Satake - Karate Japan Open champion 
Maurice Smith - W.K.C. Light-Heavyweight World champion, W.K.A. Kickboxing Heavyweight World champion

K-1 Grand Prix '93 Tournament

Results

See also
List of K-1 events
K-1 World Grand Prix
List of K-1 champions
List of male kickboxers

References

External links
K-1 Official Website
K-1 Grand Prix '93 on K-1 Channel

K-1 events
1993 in kickboxing
1993 in Japanese sport
Sports competitions in Tokyo
Kickboxing in Japan